The Chicago Symphony Orchestra (CSO) was founded by Theodore Thomas in 1891. The ensemble makes its home at the Symphony Center in Chicago and plays a summer season at the Ravinia Festival. The music director is Riccardo Muti, who began his tenure in 2010. The CSO is one of five American orchestras commonly referred to as the "Big Five".

History

In 1890, Charles Norman Fay, a Chicago businessman, invited Theodore Thomas to establish an orchestra in Chicago. Under the name "Chicago Orchestra," the orchestra played its first concert October 16, 1891 at the Auditorium Theater. It is one of the oldest orchestras in the United States, along with the New York Philharmonic, the Boston Symphony Orchestra and the Saint Louis Symphony Orchestra.

Orchestra Hall, now a component of the Symphony Center complex, was designed by Chicago architect Daniel H. Burnham and completed in 1904. Maestro Thomas served as music director for thirteen years until his death shortly after the orchestra's newly built residence was dedicated December 14, 1904. The orchestra was renamed "Theodore Thomas Orchestra" in 1905 and today, Orchestra Hall still has "Theodore Thomas Orchestra Hall" inscribed in its façade.

In 1905, Frederick Stock became music director, a post he held until his death in 1942. The orchestra was renamed the Chicago Symphony Orchestra in 1913.

Subsequent music directors have included Désiré Defauw, Artur Rodziński, Rafael Kubelík, Fritz Reiner, Jean Martinon, Georg Solti, and Daniel Barenboim.  Solti thought it was essential to raise the orchestra's international profile. He led it in a European tour in 1971, playing in ten countries. It was the first time in its 80-year history that the orchestra had played outside of North America.  The orchestra received plaudits from European critics, and was welcomed home at the end of the tour with a ticker-tape parade.

On May 5, 2008, the CSO announced the appointment Riccardo Muti as its 10th music director, starting with the 2010–2011 season, for an initial contract of 5 years.  His contract was renewed for another five years, through the 2020 season.  Muti's most recent CSO contract extension, announced in January 2018, is through the 2021–2022 season.  In January 2020, the CSO confirmed that Muti is to conclude his music directorship of the orchestra at the close of the 2021–2022 season.  In September 2021, the CSO announced a revision to Muti's contract as its music director, with an extension of the scheduled closing date of his tenure to the end of the 2022–2023 season.

The orchestra has also hosted many distinguished guest conductors, including Thomas Beecham, Leonard Bernstein, Aaron Copland, Edward Elgar, Morton Gould, Paul Hindemith, Erich Kunzel, Erich Leinsdorf, Charles Munch, Eugene Ormandy, André Previn, Sergei Prokofiev, Sergei Rachmaninoff, Maurice Ravel, Arnold Schoenberg, Leonard Slatkin, Leopold Stokowski, James Levine, Richard Strauss, George Szell, Klaus Tennstedt, Michael Tilson Thomas, Bruno Walter, and John Williams. Many of these guests have also recorded with the orchestra. Carlos Kleiber made his only symphonic guest appearances in America with the CSO in October 1978 and June 1983.

The three principal guest conductors of the orchestra have been Carlo Maria Giulini, Claudio Abbado, and Pierre Boulez.

The CSO holds an annual fundraiser, originally known as the Chicago Symphony Marathon, more recently as "Radiothon" and "Symphonython," in conjunction with Chicago radio station WFMT. As part of the event, from 1986 through 2008, the orchestra released tracks from their broadcast archives on double LP/CD collections, as well as two larger sets of broadcasts and rarities (CSO: The First 100 Years, 12 CDs, 1991; CSO in the 20th Century: Collector's Choice, 10 CDs, 2000).

Ravinia Festival
The Chicago Symphony Orchestra maintains a summer home at the Ravinia Festival in Highland Park, Illinois. The CSO first performed there during Ravinia Park's second season on November 20, 1905, and continued to appear there on and off through August 1931, after which the Park fell dark due to the Great Depression. The CSO helped to inaugurate the first season of the Ravinia Festival on July 3, 1936, and has been in residence at the Festival every summer since. The one exception to this is during the COVID-19 pandemic, when the orchestra did not perform any concerts due to Ravinia announcing that it had cancelled all concerts for the 2020 season.

Many conductors have made their debut with the Chicago Symphony Orchestra at Ravinia, and several have gone on to become music director for the festival, including Seiji Ozawa (1964–68), James Levine (1973–93), and Christoph Eschenbach (1995–2003). James Conlon, held the title from 2005 until 2015.  The Ravinia Festival created an honorific title for James Levine, "Conductor Laureate", and signed him to a five-year renewable contract beginning in 2018. On December 4, 2017, after Levine was accused of sexual misconduct, the Ravinia Festival severed all ties with Levine, and terminated his five-year contract to lead the Chicago Symphony there.  Marin Alsop served as the festival's first artistic curator from 2018 until 2019, and she is scheduled to begin her tenure as chief conductor and curator in 2021.

Recordings
The Chicago Symphony Orchestra has amassed an extensive discography. Recordings by the Chicago Symphony Orchestra and Chorus have earned sixty-four Grammy Awards from the Recording Academy. These include several Classical Album of the Year awards, awards in Best Classical Performance in vocal soloist, choral, instrumental, engineering and orchestral categories.

On May 1, 1916, Frederick Stock and the orchestra recorded the Wedding March from Felix Mendelssohn's music to A Midsummer Night's Dream for Columbia Records. Stock and the CSO made numerous recordings for Columbia and the Victor Talking Machine Company/RCA Victor.  The Chicago Symphony's first electrical recordings were made for Victor in December 1925, including a performance of Karl Goldmark's In Springtime overture.  These early electrical recordings were made in Victor's Chicago studios; within a couple of years Victor began recording the CSO in Orchestra Hall. Stock continued recording for Columbia and RCA Victor until his death in 1942.

In 1951, Rafael Kubelík made the first modern high fidelity recordings with the orchestra, in Orchestra Hall, for Mercury.  Like the very first electrical recordings, these performances were made with a single microphone.  Philips has reissued these performances on compact disc with the original Mercury label and liner notes.

In March 1954, Fritz Reiner made the first stereophonic recordings with the CSO, again in Orchestra Hall, for RCA Victor, including  performances of two symphonic poems by Richard Strauss: Ein Heldenleben and Also sprach Zarathustra.  Reiner and the orchestra continued to record for RCA Victor through 1963.  These were mostly recorded in RCA Victor's triple-channel "Living Stereo" process.  RCA has digitally remastered the recordings and released them on CD and SACD.  Jean Martinon also recorded with the CSO for RCA Victor during the 1960s, producing performances that have been reissued on CD.

Sir Georg Solti recorded with the CSO primarily for Decca Records. These Solti recordings were issued in the U.S. on the London label and include a highly acclaimed Mahler series, recorded, in part, in the historic Medinah Temple—some installments were recorded in the Krannert Center for the Performing Arts at the University of Illinois (in Urbana), as well as in the Sofiensaal in Vienna, Austria.  Many of the recordings with Daniel Barenboim were released on Teldec.

In 2007, the Chicago Symphony formed its own recording label, CSO Resound. After an agreement was reached with the Orchestra's musicians, arrangements were made for new recordings to be released digitally at online outlets and on compact disc. The first CSO Resound CD, a recording of Haitink's rendition of Mahler's Third Symphony, was released in the spring of 2007. Releases that followed included Bruckner's Seventh Symphony, Mahler's Sixth Symphony, and Shostakovich's Fourth Symphony (Grammy winner), all conducted by Haitink; Shostakovich's Fifth Symphony led by Myung-Whun Chung; "Traditions and Transformations: Sounds of Silk Road Chicago" with the Orchestra's Judson and Joyce Green Creative Consultant Yo-Yo Ma (Grammy winner); and recordings of Verdi's Requiem (Grammy winner) and Otello, under the direction of Muti.

The Chicago Symphony Orchestra and Chorus have recorded the music for two movies: Fantasia 2000 conducted by James Levine and Lincoln conducted by John Williams. Selections from the Orchestra and Chorus's recording of Johann Sebastian Bach's St Matthew Passion, conducted by Sir Georg Solti, were used in the movie Casino.

Broadcasts
The Chicago Symphony first broadcast on the radio in 1925.  Though often sporadic, there have been broadcasts ever since. With the 1965–1966 season, Chicago radio station WFMT began regular tape-delayed stereo broadcasts of CSO concerts, running through the 1968–1969 season. They resumed from 1976 through the 2000–2001 season before ceasing due to lack of sponsorship. In 2007, the broadcasts once again resumed with a 52-week series.  The broadcasts were originally sponsored by BP and air on 98.7 WFMT in Chicago and the WFMT Radio Network.  They consist of 39 weeks of recordings of live concerts, as well as highlights from the CSO's vast discography.

The CSO appeared in a series of telecasts on WGN-TV, beginning in 1953.  The early 1960s saw the videotaped telecast series Music from Chicago, conducted by Fritz Reiner and guest conductors including Arthur Fiedler, George Szell, Pierre Monteux, and Charles Munch.  Many of these televised concerts, from 1953 to 1963, have since been released to DVD by VAI Distribution.

Sir Georg Solti also conducted a series of concerts with the Chicago Symphony that were recorded for the European firm Unitel and were broadcast in the 1970s on PBS.  They have subsequently been reissued by Decca Video on DVD.

Civic Orchestra of Chicago 
Frederick Stock founded the Civic Orchestra of Chicago, the first training orchestra in the United States affiliated with a major symphony orchestra, in 1919.  Its goal is to recruit pre-professional musicians and train them as high-level orchestra players.  Many alumni have gone on to play for the CSO or other major orchestras.  It is currently the only training orchestra sponsored by a major orchestra in North America.

The Civic Orchestra performs half a dozen orchestral concerts and a chamber music series annually in Symphony Center and in other venues throughout the Chicago area free of charge to the public.

Music directors, conductors

Music Directors & Principal Conductors
 Theodore Thomas (1891–1905)
 Frederick Stock (1905–1942)
 Désiré Defauw (1943–1947)
 Artur Rodziński (1947–1948)
 Rafael Kubelík (1950–1953)
 Fritz Reiner (1953–1962; musical advisor, 1962–1963)
 Jean Martinon (1963–1968)
 Irwin Hoffman (1968–1969, acting music director)
 Sir Georg Solti (1969–1991)
 Daniel Barenboim (1991–2006)
 Bernard Haitink (2006–2010, Principal Conductor)
 Riccardo Muti (2010–present)

Titled conductors
 Carlo Maria Giulini – Principal Guest Conductor, 1969–1972
 Claudio Abbado – Principal Guest Conductor, 1982–1985 
 Sir Georg Solti – Music Director Laureate, 1991–1997
 Pierre Boulez – Principal Guest Conductor, 1995–2006 
 Pierre Boulez – Helen Regenstein Conductor Emeritus, 2006–2016

Composers-in-residence
 John Corigliano (1987–1990)
 Shulamit Ran (1990–1997)
 Augusta Read Thomas (1997–2006)
 Osvaldo Golijov (2006–2010)
 Mark-Anthony Turnage (2006–2010)
  Anna Clyne (2010–2015)
 Mason Bates (2010–2015)
 Elizabeth Ogonek (2015–2018)
 Samuel Adams (2015–2018)
 Missy Mazzoli (2018–2021)
 Jessie Montgomery (2021–present)

Assistant / associate conductors
 Arthur Mees – Assistant, 1896–1898
 Frederick Stock – Assistant, 1899–1905
 Eric DeLamarter – Assistant; 1918–1933; Associate, 1933–1936
 Hans Lange – Associate, 1936–1943; Conductor 1943–1946
 Tauno Hannikainen – Assistant, 1947–1949; Associate; 1949–1950
 George Schick – Assistant, 1950–1952; Associate, 1952–1956
 Walter Hendl – Associate, 1958–1964
 Irwin Hoffman – Assistant, 1964–1965; Associate, 1965–1968; Conductor 1969–1970
 Henry Mazer – Associate, 1970–1986
 Kenneth Jean – Associate, 1986–1993
 Michael Morgan – Assistant, 1986–1993
 Yaron Traub – Assistant 1995–1998, Associate, 1998–1999
 William Eddins – Assistant, 1995–1998; Associate, 1998–1999; Resident 1999–2004

Ravinia Festival
 Walter Hendl – Artistic Director, 1959–1963
 Seiji Ozawa – Music Director, 1964–1968
 Seiji Ozawa – Principal Conductor, 1969
 István Kertész – Principal Conductor, 1970–1972
 James Levine – Music Director, 1973–1993
 Christoph Eschenbach – Music Director, 1995–2003
 James Conlon – Music Director, 2005–2015 
 Marin Alsop – Artistic Curator, 2018–2019
 Marin Alsop – Chief Conductor and Curator, 2020–present

Honors and awards

The Chicago Symphony Orchestra was voted the best orchestra in the United States and the fifth best orchestra in the world by editors of the British classical music magazine Gramophone in November, 2008. The same was said by a panel of critics polled by the classical music website bachtrack in September, 2015.

Grammy Awards

Recordings by the Chicago Symphony Orchestra have earned sixty-four Grammy Awards from the Recording Academy.

Riccardo Muti, music director, has won two Grammy Awards, both with the Chicago Symphony Orchestra and Chorus, for the recording of Verdi's Messa da Requiem on the CSO Resound label. Duain Wolfe, chorus director, has won two Grammy Awards for his collaboration with the Chorus, also for Verdi's Messa da Requiem on the CSO Resound label.

Bernard Haitink, former principal conductor, has won two Grammy Awards, including one with the Chicago Symphony Orchestra for the recording of Shostakovich's Fourth Symphony on the CSO Resound label.

Pierre Boulez, former conductor emeritus and principal guest conductor, won twenty-six Grammy Awards including eight with the Chicago Symphony Orchestra and Chorus. Boulez is the sixth all-time Grammy winner, behind Beyoncé (thirty-two), Sir Georg Solti (thirty-one), Quincy Jones (twenty-eight), Alison Krauss, and Chick Corea (twenty-seven each). Boulez also received the Academy's 2015 Lifetime Achievement Award.

Sir Georg Solti, former music director and music director laureate, won thirty-one Grammy Awards—more than any other recording artist. He received seven awards in addition to his twenty-four awards with the Chicago Symphony Orchestra and Chorus. In addition, Sir Georg Solti and producer John Culshaw received the first NARAS Trustees' Award in 1967 for their "efforts, ingenuity, and artistic contributions" in connection with the first complete recording of Richard Wagner's Der Ring des Nibelungen with the Vienna Philharmonic. Solti also received the Academy's 1995 Lifetime Achievement Award.

Margaret Hillis, founder and longtime director of the Chicago Symphony Chorus, won nine Grammy Awards for her collaborations with the Orchestra and Chorus.

Volunteer groups
African American Network
Governing Members (established 1894)
Latino Alliance
League of the Chicago Symphony Orchestra Association (formerly the Women's Association, established 1934)
Overture Council (established 2009)
Women's Board

See also
 List of museums and cultural institutions in Chicago
Chicago Symphony Chorus

Notes

References

External links 

 
 Experience CSO
 From the Archives blog
 Chicago Symphony Chorus website
 Chicago Symphony Orchestra Sounds and Stories (archived)
 Silk Road website
 Interviews with Sir Georg Solti by Bruce Duffie, May & October, 1988
 Interview with Margaret Hillis, founder of the Chicago Symphony Chorus, by Bruce Duffie, July, 1986
 Chicago Symphony Orchestra "From The Archives" Marathon/Radiothon/Symphonython index

Musical groups established in 1891
Musical groups from Chicago
Wikipedia requested audio of orchestras
1891 establishments in Illinois
Orchestras based in Illinois
Columbia Records artists
RCA Records artists
Sony Classical Records artists
Cedille Records artists